The Drzewica Formation (Also Called Drzewica Series/Seria Drzewicka or Serii Drzewiekiej and in older literature Brónow Series)  is a geologic formation in Szydłowiec, Poland. It is Pliensbachian in age. Vertebrate fossils have been uncovered from this formation, including dinosaur tracks. The Drzewica Formation is part of the Depositional sequence IV-VII of the late lower Jurassic Polish Basin, with the IV showing the presence of local Alluvial deposits, with possible meandriform deposition origin, dominated in Jagodne and Szydłowiec, while delta system occurred through the zone of the modern Budki. The sequence V shows a reduction of the  erosion in the Zychorzyn borehole of the Drzewica Formation, showing changes on the extension of the marine facies, where upper deposits change from Alluvial to Deltaic-Seashore depositional settings. VI-VII facies were recovered on the Brody-Lubienia borehole, with a lower part exposed on the village of Śmiłów that shows a small fall of the Sea level.
The stathigraphic setting of the dinosaur tracks reported from the formation suggest a Seashore or Deltaic barrier. Body fossils reported include bivalves, palynology, fossil trunks, roots. Trunks of coniferous wood, especially Cheirolepidiaceae and Araucariaceae trees  show the occurrence of vast coniferous forests around the tracksite. The association of forests and dinosaur megafauna on the Pliensbachian suggests also a colder and specially dry ecosystem. Drzewica deposits where in part to be a gigantic shore barrel, setting at the time where the Polish basin sea was at its lowest point. Other related units are Fjerritslev or Gassum Formation (Danish Basin), Hasle & Sorthat Formation (Bornholm), upper Neringa Formation (Lithuania). Abandoned  informal units in Poland: upper Sawêcin beds, Wieluñ series or  Bronów series.

Description
The Drzewica Formation between Gowarczów and Rozwady, forms Sandstone complexes of +10 or so meters, usually uniformly formed, finely less often medium-grained, separated by Silt-sandstone blocks, sandstone-like places or Siltstones. In these sediments there are worm tubules (Ichnofossils),  Rhizoids and the remains of Charred plants, sometimes thin carbon inserts. This section on the area of Gowarczów-Rozwady wasn't completely covered, but connects the appearance of the Drzewica Formation strata with several coeval Boreholes: Gowarczów (GW-1 and GW-2), Kuraszków (KP-1 and KP-4), Sielec (A2), Adamów (Al), Kraszków (MG-2), Gielniów (GG-1) and in a few exposures (quarries) from the vicinity of Kraszków and Gielniów. On this region the most complete profile of this formation was obtained in the Sielec Borehole (A2), which was pierced by the geological structure of the outcrop zone, covering the middle and upper section of the Drzewica Formation with a thickness of 146.7 m. Locally, the thickness of this series is estimated at 175–180 m.

Profile

Paleogeography
At the Late Pliensbachian (Margaritatus-Spinatum) several changes occur on the Polish Basin. The last section, latest Raricostatum subzone, there were a series marine transgressive surfaces, linked with the called Pli1 transgressive phase, known thanks to molluscs and ooids, along with an increase of marine macrofauna and microfauna. A marine Ingression filled the Polish basin, depositing marine dark Clay, Mudstone and lenticular Heteroliths, that are abundant on the lower-Middle Pliensbachian Łobez Formation and  Poland, where dark-grey marine Claystones  appear on the Kaszewy 1 borehole. There was a visible Shoreline retreat that ends on the beginning of the Late Pliensbachian Margaritatus Chronozone. After the Pli1, a series of local subordinate retrogradational stratal-pattern architectures indicate the transgressive phase of the sequence Pli2. Pli2 The transgressive phase led to a maximum flooding level at the middle Spinatum. That was known thanks to Ammonites found on an 85 m basin at NW Poland, on the Wolin IG-1 borehole. This transgression also impacted deposition, with 265 m sequences of Mudstones and Sandstones in a syndepositional tectonic graben at the Wolin-Recław Zone. After the maximum peak of the flooding basin it followed a regressive phase, characterized by progradational fluvio-deltaic Sandstones, like the series of Sandstones that recover the major tracksites of the Drzewica Formation, the Śmiłów Quarry Tracksite and the Wólka Karwicka Tracksite, both know from a regression nearshore/barrier lagoonar derived sandstone deposit. The Coeval deposits of Usedom and East Prignitz on Germany contain numerous Glendonites (Calcite pseudomorphs after Ikaite), what lends support to the possibility of a Late Pliensbachian cooling event and polar Glaciation at that time. Mostly of the authors, based on the current scientific quorum and the wide distribution of Glendonites in Upper Pliensbachian strata, tend to support a glacial-derived hypothesis.
The Spinatum regression collides with the worldwide Toarcian Oceanic Anoxic event. The oldest deposits of the sequence (Latest Pliensbachian-Lowermost Toarcian), partly of an age resting on a regional erosional surface, comprise alluvial and deltaic sediments assigned to a number of lithostratigraphic units of local significance. The sequence recovers significant sea-level falls, that are related with the recurrent Late Pliensbachian glaciation, that would be followed at the start of the Toarcian with Global warming and a large scale trangression, recovered locally on the Ciechocinek Formation.

Thanks to data from the Kaszewy 1 borehole levels of 1200 pCO2 were recovered, thanks to Plant stomatal index, being the highest amount recovered on the whole Lower Jurassic interval. The studied strata also led to know a great variability in Total Organic Content, interpreted as result of a greater terrestrial biodegradation. This led to knowing that the lower temperatures recovered from the Polish Basin in this interval occurred in the latest Rhaetian/earliest Hettangian, the late Hettangian, early Pliensbachian and especially in the Late Pliensbachian (Stokesi, Gibbosus, Spinatum), being this last the coolest period in the whole Early Jurassic.

Sedimentological evolution
The Formation strata starts on the Polish Jurassic Depositional sequence V, that besides Drzewica area and Budki–Szydłowiec–Jagodne area, is also known from the Brody-Lubienia borehole (with a massive exposure of the sequence V in an operating quarry near Bielowice, the major one along with Skrzynno near Przysucha), that is located on the eastern part of the Holy Cross Mts region, giving insight into development of Pliensbachian deposits in the marginal parts of this basin. The initial part of this sequence is associated with a local fall of the sea level, where the lower IV level transition exposes with erosion, on locations such as the Zychorzyn borehole (at depth of 96.1 m) on Drzewica. The latter sedimentation is marked with thin deposits from delta-distributary depositional subsystem, that become thicker around the Budki, where in the zone of the Brody-Lubienia borehole an alluvial-meandering channel deposition system developed. After this initial regression there was a local transgression that led to abundance of local trace fossils and the formation of barrier-lagoonal deposits on Budki and in Brody-Lubienia, along with the increased presence of marine bivalves. In the Brody-Lubienia borehole were developed in embayment-lagoon facies. After the major marine transgression there was a visible change on Budki–Szydłowiec–Jagodne,  shifting to fluvial discharge continuously moving along the Nowe Miasto–Iłża fault to the NE direction during the Pliensbachian times. At this time on the Jagodne 1 borehole it was deposited the development of a barrier-lagoon linked with a delta.

The Depositional sequence VI starts on the Jagodne 1 borehole with very large Mud clasts, pointing to intensive erosion of the underlying lagoonal sediments, while on the basin center, on the Zychorzyn borehole the erosion on lower sediments was lesser aggressive. The sediments that were deposited at the start of this sequence are uniformly represented by coarse alluvial deposits, interpreted as meandering river with possible conspicuous share of bed load transport. On the Budki 1 borehole series of coarse-grained alluvial package (especially large scale tabular cross-bedding sets dominate and quartz pebbles association), can represent low-sinuosity braided channels. Another transgressive phase on this sequence led to the formation of foreshore/shoreface/barrier deposits, and a local event on the Polish Basin, where
there was a rapid drowning of the palaeorelief with alluvial valleys and coastal plains, resulting in embayed coastline with detached beach/barrier ridges. There was equilibrium with the sea level, with periodical little regressions and transgressions. The maximum flooding range of this phase is represented by the Szydłowiec sandstones, developed on a regressive period where on Śmiłów was developed an eolian dune depositional subsystem linked with a barrier-lagoon, know due to the presence of barrier crest eolian deposits with plants buried. In this environment, the major Tracksites of the formation were developed. Linked with the Śmiłów Quarry Sandstone appear deltaic deposits on the Brody-Lubienia borehole and on Zychorzyn.

The Depositional sequence VII is the last Pliensbachian major sequence, know especially from the Brody-Lubienia borehole and the continuation of an alluvial portion exposed also at Śmiłów, where an exposure exhibits sequence VI/VII characters, showing that the sea level fall was not so significant, as it was in the base of the previous sequence. This sequence starts with a rise of sea level and quick drowning of the whole area, destroying the previous delta system/marsh subsystem development measured at the Brody-Lubienia borehole, that shows  that the amplitude of this transgression was quite high, as is represented by a thickness of 16 m.

Śmiłów outcrop
There are several Types off Seashore Stratification seen on the Drzewica Formation. Starting with the post-Spinatum regression derived shore prograding cycle, where the nearshore deposits show detailed Hummocky cross-stratification, at the time are covered by thin beach-welded facies showing irregular “massive” bedding and numerous Plant roots penetrating down from the undulated bounding surface. Superimposed are fine grained, very well sorted Sandstones with giant tabular Cross-bedding set interpreted as beach (Backshore depositional subsystem) Eolian Dune with complete Plant remains buried in the wind-transported Sand (Mostly, Herbaceous-Built Plants). The Direction of the Wind sedimentation is clearly visible on these deposits, where the stratification of the sand is well oriented. Those deposits are abundant on the Antecki quarry. The most related to the shores, probably barrier-Lagoon and Delta depositional systems are clearly visible on the Smilów Quarry, where the exposure shows different lithofacies and strata, including fine-grained, white and light-grey Sandstones with Hummocky cross-stratification, with a series of tabular and trough Cross-bedding sets, probably related to nearmarine depositional subsystem. A more fine-medium-grained, grey to brownish sandstones also with flat-tabular-horizontal bedding with abundant drifted Plant Fossils and plant remains in situ is considered to be part of a clear foreshoreb–arrier–Eolian depositional subsystem, probably related to a series of Dune fields, related to the Sea Barriers. Kaolinized grey Mudstones with abundant Dispersed plant roots are related to more lagoonal depositional subsystems. The slightly smaller and fine built, brownish and yellow Sandstones that show details Cross-bedding are related to a more alluvial deposition, probably from the influence of a local Channel. On the Main Smilów Quarry the dominant shoreface depositional subsystem show detailed marks of clear Palaeocurrent directions, dispersed trough Cross-bedding inclinations that point to the West. There have been measurements of the Wave-formed ripple that approximately reflects a shoreline orientation. Thanks to the wave ripple crests orientation and the orientation of fossil tree logs it was indicated an inclination of the inclined tabular Foreset bed continuing across the whole outcrop. These Foreset bed show a more pronounced inclination thanks to seaward-dipping Clinoforms, what reflects the original inclination of a barrier slope, with the sum of palaeocurrent pointing to south-west.

Economic Resources

Storage
Zaosie Anticline-Jeżów Anticline are two of the three structures selected as having the best conditions for geological  storage in the Bełchatów region, with several wells drilled. Both the structures are characterized by similar geological feature and petrophysical parameters of rocks, being potential reservoirs. Significant thickness, good reservoir properties and proper depth give sufficient grounds to select the Lower Jurassic sandstone levels of the Drzewica Formation.

Budziszewice-Zaosie structure is one of the potential  storage sites for the biggest emitter of that gas in Europe, the Bełchatów Power Plant, with the major  and most perspective reservoir located on the Drzewica Formation Strata locally. Archival seismic sections subject to secondary interpretation made it possible for a more accurate mapping of the deep structure of the anticline and its definition as present state of recognition as tectonically continuous. The Major drilling hole was stablished on the top of the upper Pliensbachian, JPl3 (the top of the Drzewica formation of the first potential reservoir), with the top of the Ostrowiec formation as the second potential reservoir. Parametric models of variability were made for the resulting geometrical matrix lithology, contamination, effective porosity and total permeability of the complexes. Several works based on static 3D model recovered  effective storage capacity c.a. 10 Mt (during 6 or 30 years of injection depending on hydrodynamic conditions). Other major  storage is found on Sierpc anticline ("Upper Sławęcin Beds"), specially on the Sierpc 2 borehole, with measured capacity of 260 tonnes of dihydrogen.

Sandstone Exploitation

The Sandstones of the Drzewica Formation have been object of mining since the Middle Ages, used as key material for the local construction. Two kinds are distinctive, the main Szydłowiec Sandstones and the Kunów Sandstones, mined on Śmiłów (13th century–recent), Kunów (17th–20th century). Its exploit back them was notorious, as figures of polish Renaissance such as Jan Michałowicz, who used it for some of its most know pieces, such as the Tomb of Wolski Brothers. Kunów Sandstones have also been studied as potential geoturism attractions.

Fungi

Paleofauna
Along the  Early Jurassic, there was a mostly marginal-marine (mainly Mesohaline), deltaic and continental sedimentation that prevailed in the area of Poland. A marine basin of Polyhaline character conditions occurred mainly in the Pliensbachian, due to a flooding of the Polish Basin. Due to that,  Pliensbachian sedimentation in Pomerania developed in a shelf basin that attained depths of about 100 m, below the storm wave base. As the latest Pliensbachian began, the climate changes to a more cold environment, as prove the presence of ice sheets on northern latitude facies of the same age. That led to changes in salinity. The Drzewica Formation was influenced by an ancient swampy-lagoonal sub-system, with Deltaic currents depositing fluvial sediments. The Main Boreholes show eustatic changes on the marine conditions, with a retreat of the sea level, leading to the appearance of vegetation and abundant pollen on the uppermost parts of the formation. The regressive phase of sea level is represented by the Komorowo Beds and Upper Slawecin Beds along with the own Drzewica Formation. As the level of the sea recovered on the Toarcian, most of the setting turn out to be a bathyal marine bottom. The major outcrop of the formation, found on the Śmiłów Quarry represents a nearshore, deltaic, barrier/lagoonal ecosystem, where the biota left a high report of footprints (+200), with different sizes, that range from small to large animals of various groups. The Smilow Quarry Tracksite is the main outcrop and setting for the Footprints. Along with the coeval (also belonging to the formation) Wólka Karwicka tracksite represent the only ones recovered from the Late Liassic of Europe. The footprints are related to mostly lagoon-derived facies, unlike the vegetation, that appears on Deltaic facies. Brackish deposits are relates to Brachiopodans and other molluscs and Limuloid animals. The presence of Late Pliensbachian common ammonoids and several vertebrate clades connects the marine fauna with similar environments of the same age across Europe. The Drzewica Fauna is also, one of the few from the Pliensbachian-Toarcian Anoxic event recorded worldwide, specially referred to the vertebrate fauna reported.

Invertebrates

Ichnofossils

Bivalvia
Unidentified Blackish bivalves were reported from the formation on the first report of the Tracksites. Are related with shallow lagoonar facies.

Gastropoda

Ammonites

Crustacea

Limuloidea

Vertebrates

Chondrichthyes

Actinopteri
Unidentified fin spines are known from this formation.

Rhynchocephalia

Cynodontia

Crocodylomorpha

Theropoda

Sauropodomorpha

Ornithischia

Plants
There are traces of root plants with numerous plant remains, some of them vertically preserved, and on this basis he derived a possible dune-related origin of these sediments. The plants in the growth position were present at the bases of aeolian sandstone bodies, up to 2 m thick, which wedge out laterally and are covered by argillaceous  strata  of  coastal  lagoon  origin  with  drifted  plant  remains. Mostly of the plant remains are composed by rhizoids and undeterminble fragments, recovered at the  Szydłowiec  Sandstones, Śmiłów and Mirzec, near Starachowice. More recent studies suggest an environment of shallow seafront and beach, which of course does not exclude the presence of Aeolian zones there. Lithofacies on the Smilów Quarry shows slightly inclined beach forests and abundant plant roots in a series of barrier/foreshore–ackshore–eolian dune facies, that include even plants buried in whole dunes, while drifted plant fossils and tree logs occur on the main depositional surface. This inclined surface exposes most likely a long period of non deposition and washed plants, recovering at the same time the original tilt of the local beach.

Chmielów Flora

This flora comes from layers of the also Pliensbachian Gielniów Formation (Marginal Brackish), yet is very likely derived from the coeval Drzewica Formation deposits (Coeval costaline) of the Subsequence V. This flora includes at least 30 species:  Neocalamites hoerensis (Calamitaceae Equisetales, also found on the Podkowiński Quarry); Laccopteris angustiloba & Phlebopteris muensteri (Matoniaceae ferns); Dictyophyllum acutilobum, Hausmannia crenata, Clathropteris meniscoides & Thaumatopteris schenkii (Dipteridaceae Ferns); Todites williamsonii & Cladophlebis denticulata (Osmundaceae ferns); Pterophyllum subaequale & Nilssonia orientalis/acuminata/simplex (Bennettitales, with Nilssonia being dominant like in the Lublin Floras); Ctenis nilssoni (Cycads); Sagenopteris nilssoniana (Caytoniaceae Seed Ferns); Ginkgoites marginatus (Ginkgos); Ixostrobus siemiradzkii & Czekanowskia nathorstii/setacea (Czekanowskiales Ginkgoopsids); Hirmeriella muensteri (Cheirolepidiaceae conifers); Schizolepis follini/moelleri/braunii & Palissya sp. (Palissyaceae conifers); Podozamites angustifolius/gramineus/stobieckii/distans (Krassiloviaceae conifers).

Coals
The Kaszewy Coals found mostly on the Kaszewy-1 borehole and  Niekłan PIG-1 borehole are the major coals of the Drzewica Formation and Ciechocinek Formation, representing the Pliensbachian-Toarcian boundary. The Pliensbachian section of the Kaszewy-1 borehole comprises ~220 m of terrestrial and shallow marine siliciclastic sediments. 
This Section was located on a nearshore-deltaic influenced setting, with an increased amount of both terrestrial and marine organic matter, reflecting increased weathering and increased transport of terrestrial organic matter, with ups and downs of the amount of both marine and terrestrial matter. Here were collected fossil Charcoal in abundance and polycyclic aromatic hydrocarbon. Total fossil charcoal abundance is generally low in the Pliensbachian part of the study section, before peaking immediately above the Pl-To Boundary. The abundance of coarse fossil charcoal particles (>125 μm) in the Pliensbachian-Toarcian sections of the Kaszewy-1 core is very low (0-15 particles/10 g sediment), while fine fossil charcoal abundance is generally low in the Pliensbachian level. There is also a greater abundance of non-charcoal particles. At the start of the Toarcian locally, there is a measured increase on the amount of fine charcoal particles reflecting changes on the environment. Inside the Polycyclic Aromatic Hydrocarbons, the Pyrolytics (Benz-Anthracene, Benzo(k)Fluoranthene, Fluoranthene, Indeno[1,2,3-cd]Pyrene, Phenanthrene and Pyrene) were detected on a high variety of samples, with the  Phenanthrene as the most abundant component, while Coronene is the lowest, suggesting an origin for this last one on the pyrolysis of organic matter. Petrogenics are more abundant on the local coal samples than the Pyrolytic, what can suggest that these last ones may not reflect particularly local high levels of wildfire activity. Apparently, the Kaszewy-1 borehole did not experience increased wildfire activity, but instead that the fine fossil charcoal abundance and Pyrolytics concentration records have showed a more clear regional wildfire signal. The fossil charcoal abundance and geochemical data from Pliensbachian and Toarcian samples show evidence of at least four, and possible another two, levels of increased wildfire activity, and that these can be grouped into two larger periods of increased wildfire activity.

Palynology
The Drzewica Formation belongs to the  Horstisporites planatus (Pl) Zone (Upper Sinemurian – Pliensbachian). This level starts on the older upper part of the Ostrowiec Formation, the Łobez Formation and Komorowo Formation of Pomerania and in other equivalent units from all Poland. This Megaespore section of relatively poor compared with the lower and upper sections, with the lower boundary of the level is determined by the appearance of the indicator species Horisporites planatus  (Selaginellaceae) and The upper limit of the level is marked by the appearance of continuous occurrences of Paxillitriletes phyllicus (Isöetaceae), indicating more humid conditions, and Erlansonisporites sparassis (Selaginellaceae). This level has a series of  characteristic megaespores, such as Minerisporites institus (Isöetaceae)  and Hughesisporites pustulatus (Lycophyta) and on a minor ratio, rare occurrences of Hughesisporites planatus  recorded even above the level range. Is important to recover that the limit of the Pliensbachian-Toarcian in Poland was the first precisely defined on the basis of a detailed stratigraphic-sequential correlation, fully later confirmed by a high-resolution chemostratigraphic correlation, based on isotope analysis, with the ranges of individual megapores fitting well into this limit.  This level can be correlated with the non-megasporous level of Kuqaia quadrata, found in the sediments of the Sinemurian- Lower Pliensbachian Yangxia Formation in the Xinjiang Province, China.
In the Polish profiles, the Pl level correlates with the upper part of Rogalska's 1st phase as well as the 2nd and 3rd microflora phase, where the following indicator myospores appear: Lycopodiumsporites gristhorpensis (Lycopodiaceae), Undulatisporites undulapolus (Filicopsida) and Applanopsipollenites segmentatus (Gymnospermopsida), and in central Poland represents the works of the Upper Sinemurian and the whole Pliensbachian, being probably correlated with the middle part of the myospore level Cerebropollenites macroverrucosus (Coniferophyta), distinguished in the Pliensbachian and Toarcian deposits in northern Europe.

The Drzewica Formation palynoflora is recovered mostly on the Gutwin and Brody-Lubienia boreholes, and includes the next plant groups: Bryophyta, Lycopodiaceae, Equisetaceae, Selaginellaceae, Cyatheaceae, Dipteridaceae, Dicksoniaceae, Gleicheniaceae, Matoniaceae, Osmundaceae, Schizeaceae, Peltaspermaceae, Taxodiaceae, Cheirolepidiaceae, Araucariaceae, Podocarpaceae, Pinaceae, Gnetales, Cycadidae, Bennettitales and Ginkgoales. In between all the taxa, Pollen from Seed Ferns and Conifers dominate over miospores, indicating a relatively dry ecosystem. Freshwater algae miospores are know (Botryococcus sp., Cymatiosphaera sp.), as well Paleozoic palynoremains washed from uplands (Walchia sp., Pseudowalchia biangulina, Ullmannia frumentaria, Florinites antiquus, etc.), what indicate a clear active river influx, yet has also evidence of marine ingressions due to the presence of saltwater acritarchs (Psophosphaera coniferoides, Leiosphaeridia sp.).

Biomass
Beyond proper palynogy, biomass associated has been recovered, specially on the Brody-Lubenia borehole, with abundance of C29 diasterenes (>70%), that proves a great contribution of land plants and thus terrestrial deposits nearby. There is also in some levels abundance of algae-derived C27 and C28 diasterenes, coeval with acritachs, prasinophytes and dinoflagellates, being this last ones important primary producers in the Polish Basin. The presence of C27 sterols points to the importance of the dinoflajellates, but also other groups, such as Bangiophyceae and Eustigmatophyceae algae or marine protists like the Thraustochytriaceae. At least in some facies there is evidence of proliferation of freshwater-tolerant algae in the brackish environments of the Polish Basin.

Megaflora
The Lublin Upland fluvial sandstones contain diverse types of fossil flora, associated genera and species only with Lower Jurassic sediments. Originally, while studying the Carboniferous flora from the boreholes in the area of the planned Bogdanka Coal Mine, appeared typical flora in similar to Jurassic formations. The age of the plant material was not determined concretely until 2020, where was recovered as being Pliensbachian-Toarcian in age, with the flora representing an arid environment, more probably Pliensbachian, that is covered locally by the Drzewica Formation. The Brody-Lubienia borehole is abundant on terrestrial Palynomorphs (know due to the presence of  C29 Diasterenes, >70%), but also has high abundances of aquatic derived biomass. Even with that, there is a clear consensus with the more terrestrial character of the sediments from Brody-Lubienia, expressed by the frequent occurrence of plant roots and paleosol horizons. This also is recovered on therate of MTTCs (mono-, di- and tri-methyl-trimethyltridecyl-chromanes) where higher indices at Brody-Lubienia indicate lower salinities and a stronger influx of riverine freshwater. The environment was probably Dry, developing flora on the near Freshwater influx settings. The Lublin Flora is linked with the flowing waters from the East.
Lublin lias is dominated by cycads and Bennetites Ginkgoales and seed ferns occur sporadically, all on a conglomerate with numerous species occurs in the bottom, where the deposits are filled with of coal, mudstone, sandstone and clay siderite (reworked from the Carboniferous), as well as pebbles from Devonian limestones. Vegetation mostly grew outside the sedimentation area, as well as on shores and shallows.

At the Śmiłów Quarry, plant remains are know, and are interpreted as derived from an aeolian rework, with the plants buried in growth position by barrier crest aeolian dunes. Szydłówek quarry host also a nearshore-foreshore-backshore/eolian setting, where the flora is dominated by woody trunks, plant root moulds and impressions of drifted woody trunks, that suggest the presence of large coniferous forests around the Szydłówek tracksite. Plants here thrive on the foredune are exposed to salt spray, strong wind, and burial by blowing and accumulating sand. Ferns like Matonia braunii maybe worked as dune stabilisers, like the extant plant Leymus arenarius.

See also 
 List of fossiliferous stratigraphic units in Poland
 Sorthat Formation, Denmark
 Neringa Formation, Lithuania
 Pliensbachian formations
 Blanowice Formation, Southern Poland
 Clarens Formation, South Africa
 Fernie Formation, Canada
 Hasle Formation, Denmark
 Kota Formation, India
 Los Molles Formation, Argentina
 Mawson Formation, Antarctica
 Rotzo Formation, Italy
 Whiteaves Formation, British Columbia
 Navajo Sandstone, Utah
 Kandreho Formation, Madagascar
 Kota Formation, India
 Cattamarra Coal Measures, Australia

References 

Geologic formations of Poland
Jurassic System of Europe
Pliensbachian Stage
Sandstone formations
Mudstone formations
Alluvial deposits
Deltaic deposits
Shallow marine deposits
Ichnofossiliferous formations
Fossiliferous stratigraphic units of Europe
Paleontology in Poland